Silverback Productions (sometimes referred to as Silverback Games) is a Canadian video game developer founded in 2007 and headquartered in Halifax, Nova Scotia, Canada.

Games
The company makes primarily adventure and puzzle games and have been released on Windows, Mac, iOS and Android, with distribution through Big Fish Games. Many of their games have been well-received on the Big Fish Games portal, as well as being Top 10 titles on the iOS App Store and on Google Play.

Games developed by Silverback Games include:
 Aurora: Puzzle Adventure
 Sons of Anarchy: The Prospect
 Empress of the Deep: The Darkest Secret
 Empress of the Deep 2: Song of the Blue Whale
 Empress of the Deep 3: Legacy of the Phoenix
 Secrets of the Dragon Wheel
 Theatre of the Absurd
 Beast of Lycan Isle
 Mr. Jones' Graveyard Shift

Awards
Empress of the Deep was declared the 2011 Best Art and Character Design Winner at the 2011 International Great Game Awards by Gamehouse.  Its sequel, Empress of the Deep 2: Song of the Blue Whale was awarded 2012 Best Art Direction in the 2012 Annual Gamers Guild Awards hosted by games portal iWin.

References

External links
Official Site

Video game companies of Canada
Video game development companies
Companies based in Nova Scotia
Video game companies established in 2007
2007 establishments in Nova Scotia